Silas Nwankwo (born 12 December 2003) is a Nigerian professional footballer who plays as a striker for Swedish club Mjällby in the Allsvenskan.

Career
Nwankwo started his football career at De-Royal football academy in Lagos before moving to Sunshine Stars.  One year later, he went on to play for Nasarawa United in the NPFL making 35 appearances and scoring 19 goals in the 2020–21 season.

On 3 February 2022, Nwankwo signed a four-year contract with Swedish club Mjällby.

Honours 
Individual
 NPFL Eunisell Golden Boot: 2020–21

External links

References

2003 births
Living people
Nigerian footballers
Association football forwards
Nasarawa United F.C. players
Mjällby AIF players
Nigerian expatriate footballers
Nigerian expatriate sportspeople in Sweden
Expatriate footballers in Sweden